The Minister for Justice is the justice minister of Sweden and head of the Ministry of Justice. The current Minister for Justice is Gunnar Strömmer of the Moderate Party.

History
The office was instituted in 1809 as a result of the constitutional Instrument of Government promulgated in the same year. Until 1876 the office was called Prime Minister for Justice, similar to the office of Prime Minister for Foreign Affairs. Until 1840, the Prime Minister for Justice also served as a member of the Supreme Court. Following the ministry reform in 1840, the Prime Minister for Justice became head of the newly instituted Ministry of Justice. In 1876 the office proper of Prime Minister of Sweden was created and at the same time the Minister for Justice was created. Before 1876 the Prime Minister for Justice had in practice been granted exclusively to members of the most prominent noble families.

List of officeholders

Prime Ministers for Justice (1809–1876)

Ministers for Justice (1876–present)

Status

 According to the data above, Anna-Greta Leijon was the first female appointed as the Minister for Justice (1983). However, Laila Freivalds was the first female with a legal credential to become the Minister for Justice (1988–1991; 1994–2000)--as Leijon had a labor background.

See also
Instrument of Government (1809)
Justice ministry
Politics of Sweden

External links
 Ministry of Justice, official website